Tiwintza Canton is a canton of Ecuador, located in the Morona-Santiago Province.  Its seat is located in the town of Santiago.

References

Cantons of Morona-Santiago Province